[USA] is the third studio album from American chiptune-based pop and rock band Anamanaguchi. It was released on October 25, 2019 through Polyvinyl.

Critical reception

The album was given 7.5/10 by Pitchfork, who called it "their most emotionally grounded record yet". AllMusic reviewer Paul Simpson rated it 3.5/5, stating that it was a "a more challenging listen" than the band's previous work, but "it's filled with triumphant, transcendent moments". Holly Hazelwood of Spectrum Culture, also rating it  3.5/5, said that "With [USA], Anamanaguchi don’t reinvent the wheel, but they do spend a lot of time looking for new ways to use that wheel".

Track listing

Notes
 All tracks are co-produced by Ary Warnaar and Peter Berkman and co-written by Warnaar, Berkman, James DeVito and Luke Silas.
 Tracks 2, 5, 8, 9, and 13 were co-produced by Luke Silas.
 Tracks 2, 3, 5, 6, 8-11, and 13 were co-produced by Nathan Ritholz.
 "Sunset by Plane" is co-written by Caroline Lufkin.
 "Air On Line" is co-written by and features contributions from Porter Robinson.
 "On My Own" is co-written by Hana Pestle.

Charts

References 

2019 albums
Polyvinyl Record Co. albums
Electronic albums by American artists
Synth-pop albums by American artists
Electropop albums
Chiptune albums